John Mosley is an American football player and soldier

 John Mosley may also refer to:
 John W. Mosley, photojournalist
 John Mosley (cyclist)
 John Mosley Turner, supercentarian